José Luis Tellez (born 27 April 1938) is a former Mexican cyclist. He competed at the 1960 Summer Olympics and the 1964 Summer Olympics.

References

External links
 

1938 births
Living people
Mexican male cyclists
Olympic cyclists of Mexico
Cyclists at the 1960 Summer Olympics
Cyclists at the 1964 Summer Olympics
Sportspeople from Mexico City